Wilhelm Heinrich Waagen (23 June 184124 March 1900) was a German geologist and paleontologist. He was born in Munich and died in Vienna.

Overview
He received a Doctor of Philosophy degree at the University of Munich, where he studied the rocks and fossils of the Jurassic system, and published an elaborate work on geology (Versuch einer Allgemeinen Classification der Schichten des oberen Jura) that was crowned by the university. In 1866 he became an instructor in palaeontology at the University of Munich and at the same time taught Princess Theresa and Prince Arnulf of Bavaria. Although an excellent teacher, and especially competent in practical work, Waagen, who was a most loyal Catholic, had little prospect of obtaining a professorship at the University of Munich. Consequently, in 1870, he accepted the offer of a position as assistant in the geological survey of India, and was appointed palaeontologist in 1874.

In 1875, he returned permanently to Europe because of the severity of the Indian climate. In 1877 he became an instructor at the University of Vienna in 1877 and lectured with great success on the geology of India. In 1879 Waagen went to the German Polytechnic of Prague as professor of geology and mineralogy, and in 1890 he was professor of palaeontology at the University of Vienna. In 1886 he declined a position at the school of mines at Berlin.

He was named councillor of the board of mines (Oberbergart), and in 1893 was made a corresponding member of the Academy of Sciences. In 1898, the Geological Society of London awarded him the Lyell medal.

Waagen's writings before his trip to India treat especially the German Jura and its fossils. He was a pioneer in the geological investigation of India (the Salt Range) by the scientific presentation of rich palaeontological material. He established a refined lithostratigraphy of the Early Triassic series (Mianwali Formation) that still holds today. This allows to replace most of the ammonoids he described in their original stratigraphic position, an accomplishment rarely achieved by paleontologists in the late 19th century. He first realized how important the Early Triassic ammonoid succession of the Salt Range was for the construction of the Triassic time scale.

In 1869, after an exhaustive study of ammonites, Waagen advocated the theory of evolution or mutation for certain series of fossils. As a young man he had taken an active part in the Catholic life of Munich, and two years before his death he wrote a treatise on the first chapter of Genesis that showed both the geologist and the Christian.

Legacy
The fish Puntius waageni is named for Waagen, as it was described on the basis of a specimen that he collected.

Editorial works
Waagen was one of the editors of the periodical "Geognostische-paläontologische Beiträge" (Munich), and during the years 1894-1900 editor of the "Beiträge zur Paläontologie Oesterreich-Ungarns und des Orients" (Vienna); after the death of Joachim Barrande (1883) he edited several volumes of Barrande's work "Système silurien". 
Waagen's most important works were: 
 "Der Jura in Franken, Schwaben und der Schweiz" (Munich, 1864).
 "Klassification der Schichten des obern Jura" (Munich, 1865).
 "Über die Zone des Ammonites Sowerbyi" (Munich, 1867)
 "Die Formenreihe des Ammonites subradiatus" (Munich, 1869).
 "Ueber die geologische Verteilung der Organismen in Indien" (Vienna, 1878).
 "Das Schopfungsproblem" in "Natur und Offenbarung" (Munster, 1898; as a separate publication, 1899).
 "Gliederun der pelagischen Sedimente des Triassystems" (Vienna, 1895).
He wrote in English: "Jurassic Fauna of Kutch" (1873-6); "Productus Limestone" (1879–91); "Fossils from the Ceratite Formation" (1892).

References

External links
 

1841 births
1900 deaths
German paleontologists
19th-century German geologists
German Roman Catholics
Science teachers
German science writers
Ludwig Maximilian University of Munich alumni
German male non-fiction writers
Lyell Medal winners